Randolph Township is one of four townships in Ohio County, Indiana, United States. As of the 2010 census, its population was 4,383 and it contained 2,033 housing units.

Geography
The Ohio River defines the township's eastern border.

Cities, towns, villages
 Rising Sun

Unincorporated towns
 Buffalo at 
 Camp Shor at 
 Norths Landing at 
(This list is based on USGS data and may include former settlements.)

Cemeteries
The township contains these three cemeteries: Cedar Hedge, LaGrange and Rising Sun.

Major highways
  Indiana State Road 56
  Indiana State Road 262

School districts
 Rising Sun-Ohio County Community Schools

Political districts
 State House District 68
 State Senate District 43

References
 
 United States Census Bureau 2009 TIGER/Line Shapefiles
 IndianaMap

External links
 Indiana Township Association
 United Township Association of Indiana
 City-Data.com page for Randolph Township

Townships in Ohio County, Indiana
Townships in Indiana